Goodwood Saints Football Club is an Australian rules football club based in Adelaide. The team competes in the Adelaide Footy League.

The club dominated the Amateur League in the mid to late 2000s, winning five straight Division 1 grand finals from 2005 to 2009. They also hold the record for the longest time spent in top division of the league, which they have remained in since 1991.

History

Amalgamation and a great start (1985-90)
The Goodwood Saints Football Club was established in 1985 with the amalgamation of Goodwood Football Club and St. Raphaels Football Club. Four senior and three junior teams competed in their inaugural season in the South Australian Amateur Football League. The started their journey in Division 4 and immediately earned promotion to Division 3 by reaching the grand final, which was lost by 10 points to Glenunga.

In 1986, the club dropped to 6th position, but next season saw a major turnaround. Their first club's first A grade premiership win was the 1987 Division 3 premiership with a 79-point win against Brighton High OS at Thebarton Oval. The Saints remained in Division 2 after finishing 8th in 1988 and 7th in 1989.

The 1990 season was a highlight in the club's short history, losing just one game on their way to a grand final victory over Gaza by 37 points. Midfielder David Whelan won the Division 2 association medal and Stuart Wells kicked an impressive 128 goals for the season (including 15 in a game against Brighton High OS). The club had reached Division 1 in just six seasons after the amalgamation.

Making a statement (1991-2004)
The Saints finished in 3rd position in 1991 and 1992, 5th in 1993 but slipped to 8th position in 1994. With the arrival in 1995 of coach Brenton Honor the club firmly set its sights on the Division 1 premiership. Following disappointments in both 1995 (6th) and 1996 (4th), 1997 saw the Saints come away with their first Division 1 premiership. A desperate battle at Adelaide Oval against PHOS Camden saw captain Chris Slee and Honor lift the shield for a deserved 7-point victory.

In 1998, the Saints, under new captain Jason Goodes, finished 2nd in Honor's last year at the helm. The 1999 season saw Paul Page take over as playing coach with David Shaughnessy the new captain, but a great year was shattered with a 1-point grand final defeat. Rover Mark Ryan won the Alan Statton medal as best on ground in the grand final. The 2000 season saw the Saints slip to 5th, followed by 8th in 2001 in Page's last year at the helm.

Keiran Sporn took over in 2002 but the Saints weren't big improvers with a 7th-place finish. Another change in coach saw Trevor Hill take over in 2003 and Travis Beinke taking over as captain the side improved to a 4th-place finish.

The 2004 season saw the Saints return to the Grand Final tasting defeat by 7 points. On a positive note, then 18-year-old Cameron Wood became the Saints first AFL draftee. The young ruckman was taken at pick 18 in the 2004 draft by the Brisbane Lions after impressing as an All-Australian at the Under 18 National Championships. He was traded to Collingwood in late 2007.

The glory years (2005-09)
In 2005, David Bartel took over the captaincy. His fine season was rewarded with the Eric Pfitzner medal as the Best & Fairest player in the Division 1 competition. From 5th position, the Saints beat allcomers and were rewarded with a deserved premiership on the back of a 35-point victory over Gaza at Adelaide Oval. Bartel's outstanding season continued winning the Alan Statton medal as best on ground.

In 2006, the Saints struggled at times but improved late to finish the minor round in 4th position. Trent Mills had taken over as playing coach and in an amazing display the team progressed from the Elimination Final to the Grand Final once more. An outstanding team display saw Bartel raise the cup once again after a fantastic 47-point victory. Saints centre half forward Matthew Earl was the Alan Statton Medallist.

The 2007 season saw the club aim for 3 consecutive premierships. Trent Mills continued as coach and David Bartel as captain. The side won 14 minor round games and the focus was set toward the grand final. After losing the second semifinal, the side exacted the ultimate revenge on Gaza 2 weeks later, winning the grand final by 57 points. David Bartel won his second Alan Statton Medal for best on ground.

2008 was to be another history making year for the Saints with the side becoming the first in SAAFL history to win 4 consecutive Division 1 premierships. They finished the home and away season as minor premier by the narrowest of margins, and earned a week off at the start of the finals campaign.  The second semifinal was played against Salisbury North at Goodwood Oval with the Saints moving straight into the grand final with a 16-point victory.  The grand final was to be a rematch with Salisbury North. This time the margin was 29 points as coach Trent Mills and captain David Bartel held the premiership cup for the fourth consecutive year. Mark Demasi was dominant in the grand final, kicking 5 goals to be named the Alan Statton medalist.

The grand final was a sweet success for Demasi and Bartel who had earlier in the week shared the Division 1 Eric Pfitzner Medal as the best and fairest players in the Division 1 competition.

The 2009 season loomed as the most challenging for many years, with Mills now a non-playing coach and Bartel remaining as captain. The competition was extremely close all season and the side was unable to establish any real momentum throughout the minor round.
In the most evenly fought competition for many years the side eventually finished the minor round in 2nd position afterbeing defeated by Henley in the last minor round game. Finals were a different challenge however and after defeating Tea Tree Gully in difficult conditions at Goodwood Oval, a young Saints side outlasted premiership favourites Henley in the 2nd Semifinal. The grand final against Henley at Thebarton Oval was a tight struggle, but the determined Saints extended their winning sequence to an unprecedented 5 consecutive Division 1 premierships by running out 19-point winners.

Back down to earth (2010-present)
2010 marked the end of the Saints' league dominance, finishing 3rd after the minor round despite a flying start. After toppling Salisbury North in the Qualifying Final, they were only able to score a single point in their 2nd Semifinal against eventual premiers Henley. They suffered a shock Preliminary Final loss to Sacred Heart OC, and were unable to contest the Division 1 Grand Final for the first time in six seasons.

A Grade Premierships

 South Australian Amateur Football League A1/Division 1 (8)
 1997
 2005
 2006
 2007
 2008
 2009
 2014
 2015
 South Australian Amateur Football League A2 (1)
 1990
 South Australian Amateur Football League A3 (1)
 1987

Merger history 

Goodwood Saints Football Club was formed in 1985 as a merger of the Goodwood Football Club and the St Raphael's Football Club.

Goodwood 
The Goodwood Football Club was based at Goodwood Oval and competed in various suburban competitions over its history, most notably the South Australian Amateur Football League and the Glenelg-South Adelaide Football Association.  In 1985 they merged with the St Raphael's Football Club to form the Goodwood Saints Football Club.

A-Grade Premierships
 Mid-Southern Football Association (2)
 1928 
 1930 
 South Australian Amateur Football League A2 (2)
 1947 
 1967

St Raphael's 
The St Raphael's Football Club were an Adelaide Park Lands based club who regularly shifted between different competitions throughout much of their history.  In 1985 they merged with the Goodwood Football Club to form the Goodwood Saints Football Club.

A-Grade Premierships
 Sturt District Football Association B Division (1)
 1951 
 South Australian Amateur Football League A4 (1)
 1983 
 South Australian Amateur Football League A5 (1)
 1978

References

External links
 

Australian rules football clubs established in 1985
Adelaide Footy League clubs
Australian rules football clubs in South Australia
1985 establishments in Australia